Scrophularia nodosa (also called figwort, woodland figwort, and common figwort) is a perennial herbaceous plant found in temperate regions of the Northern hemisphere except western North America. It grows in moist and cultivated waste ground.

Growth
It grows upright, with thick, sharply square, succulent stems up to 150 cm tall from a horizontal rootstock. Its leaves are opposite, ovate at the base and lanceolate at the tip, all having toothed margins. The flowers are in loose cymes in oblong or pyramidal panicles. The individual flowers are globular, with five green sepals encircling green or purple petals, giving way to an egg-shaped seed capsule.

Fossil record
Seed identification of Scrophularia nodosa has been made from sub-stage IIIa of the Hoxnian at Clacton in Essex, from the Middle Pleistocene.

Folklore
The plant was thought, by the doctrine of signatures, to be able to cure the throat disease scrofula because of the throat-like shape of its flowers.

References

External links

 Henriette's Herbal Scrophularia Nodosa.
Scrophularia Nodosa - Homeopathic Remedies

nodosa
Medicinal plants
Flora of North America
Plants described in 1753
Taxa named by Carl Linnaeus